Maharashtra Tourism Development Corporation commonly abbreviated as MTDC, is a body of the Government of Maharashtra responsible for development of tourism in the Indian state of Maharashtra. It has been established under the Companies Act, 1956, (fully owned by Govt. of Maharashtra) for systematic development of tourism on commercial lines, with an authorized share capital of Rs. 25 crore. The paid up share capital of the corporation as on 31 March 2013 is Rs. 1538.88 lakhs.

Since inception, it been involved in the development and maintenance of the various tourist locations of Maharashtra. MTDC owns and maintains resorts at all key tourist centers and having more resorts is on the plan.

MTDC initiates and supports various cultural activities across Maharashtra with the objective to improve tourism in the state.  One such example is Sanskruti Arts Festival, Upvan, Thane which MTDC has supported along with TMC (Thane Municipal Corporation)

References

External links
 Official Website of MTDC

Tourism in Maharashtra
State agencies of Maharashtra
State tourism development corporations of India
Companies based in Mumbai
1975 establishments in Maharashtra
Government agencies established in 1975